Hemirhagerrhis viperina, commonly known as the viperine rock snake or western bark snake, is a species of snake in the family Psammophiidae. It is indigenous to areas within southwestern Angola and northwestern Namibia. It is partially arboreal. The nostrils of H. viperina has a vertical piercing in their nasal.

References 

Hemirhagerrhis viperina
Reptiles described in 1873
Taxa named by Oskar Boettger
Reptiles of Angola
Reptiles of Namibia